is the twenty-ninth single of J-pop group Morning Musume. It was released on March 15, 2006, in two editions—a normal edition, and a limited edition with five photo cards featuring the members in duos and came in special packaging. The single reached a peak of #4 on the weekly Oricon charts, and lasted in the charts for 8 weeks.

Theme, music video and choreography
As suggested by its title and lyric, the song portrays the "feeling of the speed of a spring whirlwind"; the song's protagonist is a princess cruising over the spring ocean.

The Single V was released on March 29, 2006.

Reina Tanaka is shown modelling the choreography for the PV in additional pictures. Part of this dance, the characteristic  motion of pointing one's index fingers up in the air, is often imitated by fans at concerts.

Track listings

CD 
 
 
 "Sexy Boy (Soyokaze ni Yorisotte)" (Instrumental)

Single V VD 
 "Sexy Boy (Soyokaze ni Yorisotte)"
 "Sexy Boy (Soyokaze ni Yorisotte) (Dance Shot Ver.)"

Oricon Rank and Sales Charts

CD

Members at time of single 
 4th generation: Hitomi Yoshizawa
 5th generation: Ai Takahashi, Asami Konno, Makoto Ogawa, Risa Niigaki
 6th generation: Miki Fujimoto, Eri Kamei, Sayumi Michishige, Reina Tanaka
 7th generation: Koharu Kusumi

Personnel
Hitomi Yoshizawa – minor vocals
Ai Takahashi – main vocals
Asami Konno – minor vocals
Makoto Ogawa – minor vocals
Risa Niigaki – minor vocals
Miki Fujimoto – main vocals
Eri Kamei – center vocals
Sayumi Michishige – minor vocals
Reina Tanaka – main vocals
Koharu Kusumi – center vocals
Tsunku – lyrics and composition
Yuichi Takahashi – arrangement

References

External links 
 Sexy Boy (Soyokaze ni Yorisotte) entry on the Up-Front Works official website
Sexy Boy (Soyokaze ni Yorisotte) entry on Tsunku's official website (with comments; Japanese)

Morning Musume songs
Zetima Records singles
2006 singles
Song recordings produced by Tsunku
Japanese synth-pop songs
Dance-pop songs
Songs written by Tsunku